Rabbit Lake can refer to:

Lakes
Canada
 Rabbit Lake (Nova Scotia)
 Ontario
 Rabbit Lake (Algoma District)
 Rabbit Lake (Muskoka District)
Nipissing District
 Rabbit Lake (Aylen River), in South Algonquin
 Rabbit Lake (Number One Creek), in West Nipissing
 Rabbit Lake (Temagami), in the Temagami region
 Rabbit Lake (Parry Sound District)
 Rabbit Lake (Sudbury District)

United States
 Rabbit Lake (Minnesota)

Settlements
 Rabbit Lake, Saskatchewan, a village in Saskatchewan, Canada
 Rabbit Lake Township, Minnesota, United States

Other
 Rabbit Lake mine, uranium mine in Saskatchewan, Canada